Saluting Battery may refer to:

Saluting Battery, Gibraltar
Saluting Battery (Valletta), Malta